Jining Stadium is a multi-purpose stadium in Jining, China. It is used mostly for football matches. The stadium has a capacity of 34,318. It opened in 2012 and broke ground in 2009.

References

Football venues in China
Multi-purpose stadiums in China
Sports venues in Shandong
Jining